Jabal Amiqah is a sub-district located in Hubaysh District, Ibb Governorate, Yemen. Jabal Amiqah had a population of 7069 according to the 2004 census.

References 

Sub-districts in Hubaysh District